Brunellia rufa is a species of plant in the Brunelliaceae family. It is endemic to Colombia.

References

rufa
Endemic flora of Colombia
Taxonomy articles created by Polbot

Critically endangered flora of South America